WYDL (100.3 FM, "Easy 100.3") is a radio station licensed to Middleton, Tennessee, U.S., serving Corinth, Mississippi, with a soft adult contemporary format. The station is currently owned by Flinn Broadcasting Corporation. WYDL is operated by Southern Broadcasting Corporation.

History
WYDL, originally WTCK, an urban station branded as Hot 100.7 The # 1 Hip Hop and R&B until November 2002. Mike B, a DJ from Detroit, formed MD Broadcasting in 2002 and in November 2002 launched WYDL WILD 100.7, an Adult Top 40 (CHR) station. In 2002, WTCK-FM changed the call letters to WYDL and launched with Adult Top 40 format airing Top 40 hits of the 80s, 90s and Today. However, in 2007, for a brief time, WILD 100.7 decided to take on syndication in the mornings with Bob & Tom, therefore placing Mike B (TIC TAK) in the afternoon drive time. October 19, 2007, was the last day for Bob & Tom, and a new local morning show took its place. That moved TIC TAK back to Morning Drive and paired him with Wild's night personality ACE, forming "The T&A Morning Show". In October 2009, yet another change to the "Wild" lineup, adding Elvis Duran from Z100 New York to mornings.

On October 11, 2011 WYDL moved from 100.7 FM to 100.3 FM and rebranded as "100.3 Kiss FM".

On September 20, 2013 100.3 started stunting with non-stop Elvis Presley. The last song as 100.3 Kiss-FM, according to the website, was believed to be Maroon 5's Daylight.

On September 26, 2013 WYDL ended stunting and changed their format from top 40/CHR to classic rock, branded as "Rock 100".

On July 7, 2017 WYDL changed their format from classic rock back to top 40/CHR, branded as "Hot 100".

On December 25, 2020, WYDL changed their format from top 40/CHR to soft adult contemporary, branded as "Easy 100.3".

Signal range
WYDL's signal can be heard from Jackson, Tennessee, to Tupelo, Mississippi.

Previous logo

References

External links

YDL
Soft adult contemporary radio stations in the United States
Radio stations established in 2001
2001 establishments in Tennessee